Rum Sodomy & the Lash is the second studio album by the London-based folk punk band The Pogues, released on 5 August 1985. The album reached number 13 on the UK charts. The track "A Pair of Brown Eyes", based on an older Irish tune, reached number 72 on the UK singles chart. "The Old Main Drag" later appeared on the soundtrack to the film My Own Private Idaho.

Album title 
The album's title is taken from a quotation attributed to Winston Churchill: "Don't talk to me about naval tradition. It's nothing but rum, sodomy, and the lash." The title was suggested by drummer Andrew Ranken, who said "it seemed to sum up life in our band".

Album cover 
The cover artwork is an altered version of The Raft of the Medusa, a Romantic-era painting by Theodore Géricault, with the band members' heads, painted by Peter Mennim, replacing those of various figures on the raft.

Recording 
Elvis Costello, whose manager Jake Riviera approached the band, was originally employed to produce two songs for a single, "A Pair of Brown Eyes" and "Sally MacLennane", but after recording at Elephant Studios in Wapping was extended Costello agreed to record the entire album. Chevron later said, "The Pogues needed, more than anything, not to be not so much as produced as facilitated. Recording the band as live as possible, but with a great deal of natural acoustic presence in the instruments - was quite a revolutionary thing to do 1985." Costello said, "I saw my task was to capture them in their dilapidated glory before some more professional producer fucked them up."

Critical reception and accolades

Rum Sodomy & the Lash received very positive reviews from critics. Melody Makers Adam Sweeting said, "The brightest, most intense moments of Rum ... aren't about particularities of style or delivery. This is, apart from anything else, music to hang on to other people by to stave off brutal fact and the weight of history. While The Pogues make music for drunks as well, probably, as anyone has they're also dragging an oft-ignored folk tradition into the daylight with an altogether improbable potency ... Rum ... has soul, if not a great deal of innovation, and somewhere among the glasses and the ashtrays lie a few home truths." Sounds Jane Simon called Rum Sodomy & the Lash "the finest slice of story-telling your heart could wish for". David Quantick of NME described the record as "a collection of free-ranging stuff to be sure; from the funereal folk ballad to the near spaghetti-western instrumental, raucous celebration to brown study, cheerful melody to downright strangeness. It's never sentimental, it's rarely polite, and it's certainly not ordinary ... Rum Sodomy and the Lash is more than the best record The Pogues could be expected to make at this time. It's more than a brilliant example of a band using its resources in an imaginative manner. It's probably the best LP of 1985." Robert Christgau of The Village Voice wrote that "none of it would mean much without the songs—some borrowed, some traditional, and some proof that MacGowan can roll out bitter blarney with the best of his role models."

In a retrospective review, Mark Deming of AllMusic stated that Rum Sodomy & the Lash "falls just a bit short of being the Pogues' best album, but was the first one to prove that they were a great band, and not just a great idea for a band." Daniel Bristow of the Irish music website CLUAS awarded the album an eight out of ten, calling it "a record that will never cease to delight, always a pleasure to hear and highly, highly recommended if you're not familiar with it already". Mark Cooper of Q described the record as "a proud, defiant bruise of an album that manages to be both profoundly bleak and immoderately romantic and it remains MacGowan's and The Pogues' finest hour". Uncuts Jon Wilde wrote that "the most startling thing about their second album was the steep ascendancy of MacGowan's songwriting", while Spins Jon Dolan said that the album contained "some of the purest toothless lyricism in punk-rock history."

In 2000, Q placed Rum Sodomy & the Lash at number 93 in its list of the 100 Greatest British Albums Ever. In 2012, the album was ranked number 440 on Rolling Stones The 500 Greatest Albums of All Time list. Pitchfork named it the 67th best album of the 1980s. The album was also included in the book 1001 Albums You Must Hear Before You Die.

Reissues
A remastered and expanded version of Rum, Sodomy & the Lash was released for compact disc by WEA in the European market on 11 January 2005; this re-issue was released on September 19, 2006, by Rhino Records in the United States. The remastered disc added six bonus tracks, including the entirety of the Poguetry in Motion EP and the B-sides to "Dirty Old Town" – "A Pistol for Paddy Garcia" on seven-inch and "The Parting Glass" on twelve-inch singles. The reissue included liner notes by David Quantick and a poem about the Pogues by Tom Waits.

Track listing

Personnel
Credits are adapted from the liner notes of Rum Sodomy & the Lash and Poguetry in Motion, except where noted.The PoguesShane MacGowan – vocals
Spider Stacy – tin whistle, vocals on "Jesse James"
James Fearnley – accordion
Jem Finer – banjo
Cait O'Riordan – bass, vocals on "I'm a Man You Don't Meet Every Day"
Andrew Ranken – drums
Philip Chevron – guitar, mandolin on "The Parting Glass"Additional personnelHenry Benagh – fiddle
Dick Cuthell – French horn
Tommy Keane – uilleann pipes
Terry Woods – string instruments on Poguetry in Motion
Fiachra Trench – string arrangements on Poguetry in MotionTechnical personnel'''
Elvis Costello – producer
Philip Chevron – producer on "A Pistol for Paddy Garcia" and "The Parting Glass"
Nick Robbins – engineer (2005 reissue remastering)
Paul Scully – engineer
Dave Jordan – engineer on Poguetry in MotionBob Kraushaar – engineer on Poguetry in MotionNick Davis – engineer on Poguetry in Motion''
Peter Mennim – cover art (heads)
Théodore Géricault – original painting
Frank Murray – sleeve concept
Cindy Palmano – photography
Lilly Lee – hand lettering

Charts

Certifications

References

External links

Rum, Sodomy and the Lash (Adobe Flash) at Radio3Net (streamed copy where licensed)
 

1985 albums
The Pogues albums
Albums produced by Elvis Costello
Stiff Records albums
New wave albums by English artists